The 1934–35 Hovedserien season was the first season of ice hockey in Norway. Seven teams participated in the league, and Ski- og Fotballklubben Trygg won the championship.

Regular season

External links 
 Norwegian Ice Hockey Federation

Nor
GET-ligaen seasons
1934–35 in Norwegian ice hockey